Confuzion is a puzzle game developed and published by Incentive Software for the ZX Spectrum, Commodore 64, BBC Micro, and Acorn Electron. The object is to guide a spark along a fuse wire. It is similar to the 1982 arcade game Loco-Motion. Confuzion was written by Paul Shirley who later wrote Spindizzy.

Zzap!64 magazine considered Confuzion to be the best arcade-puzzle game available at the time for the Commodore 64.

Audio track

The cassette tape on which the game was supplied also contained an audio track also titled "Confusion", which was composed by the Band Private Property (Matt Smith Lyrics, Joanne Holt/Steve Salt Music) and performed by Joanne Holt, Matt Smith, Steve Salt, Chris Weller and Gary Seaward. Rob Hubbard translated the original track into the game's soundtrack. Rob Hubbard's version of the music is mentioned in the book Bits and pieces: a history of chiptunes by Kenneth B. McAlpine

The band persuaded Incentive Software to change their audio cassette duplication process from monophonic to stereophonic, so that the music could be better appreciated (mono was fine for the computer program data which was distributed on cassette tapes in the 80s).

Matt Smith, Ph.D. has now switched from playing music on computer games to teaching and writing books about computer games. He is senior lecturer in computing at the TUDublin, Blanchardstown Campus, Dublin, Ireland.

Joanne married Steve, and is a teacher. Steve is a cabinet maker in Oxfordshire.

The graphic design for the cover of the cassette was created by Matthew Tidbury.

References

External links

Commodore 64 Website includes a link to an MP3 file of the Confuzion theme song

1985 video games
Amstrad CPC games
BBC Micro and Acorn Electron games
Commodore 64 games
Incentive Software games
Single-player video games
Video game clones
Video games developed in the United Kingdom
Video games scored by Rob Hubbard
ZX Spectrum games